A grietman (from Old Frisian greta to accuse, to summon) is partly a forerunner of the current rural mayor in the province of Friesland, and partly the forerunner of a judge.  The area of jurisdiction was the municipality or gemeente.  In the judge function, the concept was also found in the Western side of  the province of Groningen.

The grietman and judges were responsible for the administration and justice in the Frisian grietenij. The grietmannen were in turn elected or appointed, with the cooperation of the stadholder and the Executive Council. The grietman was often kept in the same family. The eleven Frisian cities have mayors. All 30 grietmen and the 11 mayors had a voting right in the Provincial States, thus giving the rural population a proportional representation in the province.

The Municipalities of Thorbecke law (promulgated in 1851) designated the Frisian grietman as mayors.

References

History of Friesland